Brudenell, Lyndoch and Raglan is a township in Renfrew County, Ontario, Canada. It was formed on January 1, 1999, through the merger of Brudenell and Lyndoch Township with Raglan Township.

Communities
The township comprises the smaller communities of Bruceton, Brudenell, Copp, Hardwood Lake, Harriets Corners, Jewellville, Latchford Bridge, Letterkenny, Lost Nation, Palmer Rapids, Quadeville, Rockingham, Schutt, Wingle and Wolfe.

Demographics 

Mother tongue (2006):
 English as first language: 90.5%
 French as first language: 0.7%
 English and French as first language: 0%
 Other as first language: 8.8%

Population trend:
 Population in 2016: 1,503
 Population in 2011: 1,658
 Population in 2006: 1,497
 Population in 2001: 1,565
 Population total in 1996: 1,611
 Brudenell and Lyndoch (township): 791
 Raglan (township): 820
 Population in 1991:
 Brudenell and Lyndoch (township): 778
 Raglan (township): 837

Notable stories
"Al Capone's Hideout", an Upper Madawaska Theatre Group production, is a musical comedy based on the story of Al Capone's stay in the area in 1942, when he and his gang allegedly hid out near Quadeville, Ontario.

See also
List of townships in Ontario

References

External links 

Municipalities in Renfrew County
Lower-tier municipalities in Ontario
Township municipalities in Ontario